Donald Carson may refer to:

 D. A. Carson (born 1946), theologian and professor of the New Testament
 Donald "Tee" Carson (died 2000), American jazz pianist